The Combat Aviation Brigade, 2d Infantry Division is a Combat Aviation Brigade of the United States Army based at Camp Humphreys. Although informally referred to as the 2d Combat Aviation Brigade, its official designation is Combat Aviation Brigade, 2d Infantry Division.

Structure

 2d Battalion (Assault), 2d Aviation Regiment
 3d Battalion (General Support), 2d Aviation Regiment
 4th Battalion (Attack Reconnaissance), 2d Aviation Regiment
5th Squadron (Air Cavalry Reconnaissance), 17th Cavalry Regiment
 602d Aviation Support Battalion

References

Aviation Brigades of the United States Army